The 2003 Palmer Cup was held on July 10–11, 2003 on the Cassique Course, Kiawah Island Club, Kiawah Island, South Carolina. Europe won 14 to 10. This was the first Palmer Cup in which qualification was extended to the whole of Europe.

Format
The format was revised so that there were singles matches on both afternoons rather than two sessions of singles on the second day. On Thursday, there were four matches of four-ball in the morning, followed by eight singles matches in the afternoon. Four foursomes matches were played on the Friday morning with a further eight singles in the afternoon. In all, 24 matches were played.

Each of the 24 matches was worth one point in the larger team competition. If a match was all square after the 18th hole, each side earned half a point toward their team total. The team that accumulated at least 12 points won the competition.

Teams
Eight college golfers from the United States and Europe participated in the event.

Thursday's matches

Morning four-ball

Afternoon singles

Friday's matches

Morning foursomes

Afternoon singles

Michael Carter award
The Michael Carter Award winners were Bill Haas and David Price.

References

External links
Palmer Cup official site

Arnold Palmer Cup
Golf in South Carolina
Palmer Cup
Palmer Cup
Palmer Cup
Palmer Cup